Nare Talia Avetian (born 3 May 2004) is an American-born Armenian footballer who plays as a defender for high school team Carlmont Scots and the Armenia women's national team.

High school career
Avetian attended Carlmont High School in Belmont, California.

International career
Avetian capped for Armenia at senior level as a 75th-minute substitution in a 2–0 friendly win over Lebanon on 8 April 2021.

References

2004 births
Living people
Citizens of Armenia through descent
Armenian women's footballers
Women's association football defenders
Armenia women's international footballers
American women's soccer players
American people of Armenian descent
21st-century American women